Les Allan (4 March 1927 – 9 February 2013) was a Scotland international rugby union footballer. Allan played as a Centre.

Rugby career

Amateur career

Allan played for Melrose.

Provincial career

Allan represented South. He played in the Scottish Inter-District Championship in its debut 1953-54 season.

The next season's campaign in 1954-55 saw South win the championship for the first time in their history. Allan played in South's fixture against Glasgow District, scoring two tries in the match in a South 18 - 11 win.

International career

He was capped for  four times from 1952 to 1953, all of the caps coming in the Five Nations matches.

References

1927 births
2013 deaths
Melrose RFC players
Rugby union centres
Rugby union players from Melrose, Scottish Borders
Scotland international rugby union players
Scottish rugby union players
South of Scotland District (rugby union) players